This article presents a list of the historical events and publications of Australian literature during 2012.

Events
Clive James is made a Commander of the Order of the British Empire for "services to literature and the media" in the Queen Elizabeth II's New Year Honours List.
Five literary figures are named in the Australia Day Honours: Paul Brunton, Stuart Macintyre, Roy Masters, Ros Pesman and Carol Woodrow.
Peter Carey is the recipient of the Bodleian Libraries' 2012 Bodley Medal. The medal is awarded by the Bodleian Libraries of the University of Oxford "to individuals who have made outstanding contributions to the worlds in which the Bodleian is active: literature, culture, science, and communication".
Incoming Premier Campbell Newman cancels the Queensland Premier's Literary Awards.
In response, a week later, the new Queensland Literary Awards are announced. The awards use a crowd-funding campaign to raise the prize-money for their initial set of awards.
Sophie Cunningham is appointed as the new head of the Australian Literature Board.
In the Queen's Birthday Honours, Peter Carey, Barbara Blackman, Rolf Harris, and Liz Jones were appointed Officers of the Order of Australia (AO), Grahame Bond and Peter Steele were appointed Members of the Order of Australia (AM), and Peter Singer was appointed Companion of the Order of Australia (AC).
Text Publishing launches its Text Classics line, reprinting Australian literary classics.
 Melbourne City Council unveils "Literature Lane", a small laneway off Little LaTrobe Street near the State Library of Victoria, in recognition of Melbourne's status as a UNESCO City of Literature.

Major publications

Literary fiction
 Romy Ash – Floundering
Murray Bail – The Voyage
 Peter Carey – The Chemistry of Tears 
 Brian Castro – Street to Street
 Michelle de Kretser – Questions of Travel
 Annah Faulkner – The Beloved
 Susan Johnson – My Hundred Lovers
Toni Jordan – Nine Days
 Tom Keneally – The Daughters of Mars
 Christopher Koch – Lost Voices
 Drusilla Modjeska – The Mountain
Stephanie Radok – An Opening: twelve love stories about art 
 Graeme Simsion – The Rosie Project
 M. L. Stedman – The Light Between Oceans
 Carrie Tiffany – Mateship with Birds
 Patrick White – The Hanging Garden
 Sue Woolfe – The Oldest Song in the World

Children's and Young Adult fiction
 Michael Gerard Bauer – Epic Fail
 Mem Fox – Good Night, Sleep Tight
 – Tell Me About Your Day Today
 – Two Little Monkeys
 Jackie French – Pennies for Hitler
 Morris Gleitzman – After
 Sonya Hartnett – Children of the King
 Steven Herrick – Pookie Aleera Is Not My Boyfriend
Doug MacLeod – The Shiny Guys
 Emily Rodda – The Silver Door
 Carole Wilkinson – Blood Brother

Science Fiction and Fantasy
 John Birmingham – Stalin's Hammer: Rome
 Trudi Canavan – The Traitor Queen
 Greg Egan – The Eternal Flame
 Will Elliott – Nightfall
 Jennifer Fallon – The Dark Divide
 Ian Irvine – Rebellion
 Margo Lanagan – Sea Hearts
Jaclyn Moriarty – A Corner of White
 Garth Nix – A Confusion of Princes

Crime and Mystery
 Jessie Cole – Darkness on the Edge of Town
 Peter Corris – Comeback
 Kathryn Fox – Cold Grave
 Kerry Greenwood – Unnatural Habits
 Katherine Howell – Silent Fear
 L. A. Larkin – Thirst
 Gabrielle Lord – Death by Beauty
 Zane Lovitt – The Midnight Promise
 Colleen McCullough – The Prodigal Son
 Geoffrey McGeachin – Blackwattle Creek
 Adrian McKinty – The Cold, Cold Ground
 Tara Moss – Assassin
 Malla Nunn – Silent Valley
 Michael Robotham – Say You're Sorry

Poetry
 Rosemary Dobson – Rosemary Dobson: Collected
 Kate Fagan (poet) – First Light
 Robert Gray – Cumulus: Collected Poems
 John Kinsella – Jam Tree Gully: Poems
 Kate Lilley – Ladylike
 Rhyll McMaster – Late Night Shopping
 Jennifer Maiden – Liquid Nitrogen
 Les Murray ed. –  The Quadrant Book of Poetry 2001–2010
 John Shaw Neilson – Collected Verse of John Shaw Neilson
 Peter Rose – Crimson Crop
 Randolph Stow – The Land's Meaning: New Selected Poems (edited by John Kinsella)
 John Tranter ed. – The Best Australian Poems 2012

Biography
 John Bailey – Into the Unknown: The Tormented Life and Expeditions of Ludwig Leichhardt
 Daryl Dellora – Michael Kirby: Law, Love and Life
 Gideon Haigh – On Warne
 Jenny Hocking – Gough Whitlam: His Time: Volume 2
J. C. Kannemeyer – J. M. Coetzee: A Life in Writing
 Malcolm Knox – Bradman's War: How the 1948 Invincibles Turned the Cricket Pitch into a Battlefield
 Mungo MacCallum  – The Good, the Bad and the Unlikely: Australia's Prime Ministers
 David McKnight – Rupert Murdoch: An Investigation of Political Power
 Brenda Niall – True North: The Story of Mary and Elizabeth Durack

Drama
 Ian Meadows – Between Two Waves
 Tee O'Neill – Barassi

Awards and honours

Lifetime achievement

Literary

Fiction

National

Children and Young Adult

National

Crime and Mystery

National

Science Fiction

Non-Fiction

Poetry

Drama

Deaths
 14 April – Bruce Bennett, literary academic (born 1941)
18 June – Don Charlwood, writer (born 1915)
 27 June – Rosemary Dobson, poet (born 1920)
 27 June – Peter Steele, poet (born 1939)
 6 August – Robert Hughes, writer and critic (born 1928)
 20 September – Robert G. Barrett, novelist (born 1942)
 14 October – Max Fatchen, writer for children (born 1920)
 22 November – Bryce Courtenay, novelist (born 1939)

See also
 Literature
 List of years in Australian literature
 List of Australian literary awards
 2012 in Australia
 2012 in literature
 2012 in poetry

References

Literature
Australian literature by year
21st-century Australian literature
2012 in literature